Nikolay Vasilyevich Denin (born 15 May 1958) is a Russian politician who served as the governor of Bryansk Oblast from 2004 to 2014.  He is a member of the United Russia party.

He won his election in 2004 by a wide margin after the incumbent governor, Yury Lodkin was removed from the ballot by a court, just days before the vote. Denin had previously worked as the head of a chicken processing plant and was elected to the State Duma from Bryansk constituency in Bryansk Oblast by the United Russia party in December 2003. In the 2012 Russian gubernatorial election, he was re-elected to the governor of Bryansk before being succeeded by Alexander Bogomaz as acting governor in 2014.

References

1958 births
Living people
Governors of Bryansk Oblast
United Russia politicians
21st-century Russian politicians
Fourth convocation members of the State Duma (Russian Federation)